Stafford services is a pair of motorway service stations on the M6 motorway near Stone, Staffordshire, England. In August 2011 it was rated as 4 stars (northbound - Moto) and 3 stars (southbound - Roadchef) by quality assessors at Visit England.

It is unusual, in that the facilities on the northbound (opened 1996) and southbound (1999) sides of the motorway are operated by separate companies: Moto (formerly Granada) and Roadchef respectively.

History
Prior to the construction of the station, a geophysical survey was undertaken to examine cropmarks which possibly marked the location of a ring ditch to ensure that an archaeological site was not destroyed. The ditch was not found, although medieval and post-medieval artefacts were recovered.

Blue Boar constructed the southbound services, in addition to their services at Watford Gap but shortly before completion in 1999 they were acquired by Roadchef, who now operate the site.

The 2019 Motorway Services User Survey found that Stafford's northbound side was in the top five motorway services in the UK for customer satisfaction.

Location
The services are located in Staffordshire on the M6 motorway between junctions 14 and 15, and are accessed directly from the motorway.

References

External links
 Moto official website — Stafford North
 RoadChef official website — Stafford South
 Motorway Services Trivia website — Stafford
 Stafford North — Motorway Services Online
 Stafford South — Motorway Services Online

1966 establishments in England
M6 motorway service stations
Moto motorway service stations
RoadChef motorway service stations
Buildings and structures in Staffordshire
Transport in Staffordshire